Edward Frank Danowski (September 30, 1911 – February 1, 1997) was an American football player who played quarterback and halfback in the National Football League (NFL). He grew up in Aquebogue, his father, Anton, was a Polish immigrant.

Football career
A graduate of Fordham University, Danowski played for the New York Giants for seven seasons (1934–1939, 1941). Although statistics are not kept for his record of wins and losses during his career, Danowski proved a worthy quarterback presence for seven seasons, with the Giants having just one losing season during his time with the team, as he served as the primary starter from 1935 to 1939, leading the Giants to four NFL Championship games (1934, 1935, 1938, 1939). Danowski's best season as a pro was in 1935, as he threw for 794 yards and 10 touchdowns on a combined 57-of-113 (all of which were league highs) with nine interceptions, and became the first quarterback in league history to throw for more touchdowns than interceptions in a season. He also ran for 335 yards on 130 carries for two touchdowns as he was named First-team All-Pro. Danowski also led the league in passer rating in 1937 and 1938 (with rates of 72.8 and 66.9, respectively). Since records of the passer rating were tabulated for the 1936 season, Danowski was the first quarterback to lead the league in passer rating in consecutive years, which would not occur again until Tommy Thompson did so in 1948-49.

In the 1934 NFL Championship Game the team faced the 13-0 and heavily favored Chicago Bears. He went 6-of-11 for 83 yards with a touchdown and two interceptions while running for 59 yards on 20 carries and a touchdown as the Giants rallied from being down 13-3 in the final quarter to score four touchdowns (two from Ken Strong and the others being by Danowski) to win 30-13 in a game commonly referred to as the "Sneakers Game", as the Giants switched to the shoe in the third quarter to play better on the frozen Polo Grounds surface. The following year, he led the Giants back to the title game. Facing the Detroit Lions, he went 4-of-7 for 88 yards with a touchdown and an interception while running for 14 yards on seven carries and returning kicks for 51 combined yards. However, in a game of rushing the Lions outpaced them (running for 246 yards on 65 carries while passing just five times while New York ran for 106 yards on 44 carries) in a 26-7 rout.

In 1938, the Giants returned to the title game. Facing the Green Bay Packers at home, he threw 7-of-11 for 74 yards for two touchdowns. His touchdown pass to Hank Soar from 23 yards in the third quarter proved the winning score as New York overcame being outrun and outpassed with turnover luck (3 to 1) as Danowski became the first quarterback to win and lose two NFL Championship games. The two teams met again the following year for the title, with Green Bay not to be denied this time at home. Danowski threw 4-of-12 for 47 yards with three interceptions while the Packers routed them 27-0. Pulling Danowski from the game did not help matters much, as Eddie Miller, Tuffy Leemans, and Len Barnum went a combined 5-of-14 for three interceptions.

By 1939, the Giants would start other players in the position that ranged from Miller to Leemans (who generally served as a fullback), and a permanent quarterback for the team would not occur until Charlie Conerly was drafted in 1948. After having left the game in 1939, he returned for one more season in 1941, making appearances in six games. He threw a combined 12-of-24 for 179 yards and two touchdowns to three interceptions as Tuffy Leemans helped lead the Giants to an NFL Championship game appearance and Danowski left the game for good after the season ended.

Coaching career
After leaving football, he returned to Rose Hill as the head coach for the Rams from 1946 to 1954, amassing a record of 29–44–3 (.401). His 1949 squad reached #20 in the polls.

Personal life
His son, John Danowski, is the head lacrosse coach at Duke University as well as the longtime coach of the Hofstra Pride, and his grandson, Matt Danowski, is second in Division I in total points in NCAA lacrosse history.

Ed was inducted into the Suffolk Sports Hall of Fame on Long Island, New York, in the Football Category with the Class of 1991.

Head coaching record

See also
 History of the New York Giants (1925–78)

References

External links
 

1911 births
1997 deaths
American football quarterbacks
American football running backs
Fordham Rams football coaches
Fordham Rams football players
New York Giants players
United States Navy personnel of World War II
People from Riverhead (town), New York
Coaches of American football from New York (state)
Players of American football from New York (state)
American people of Polish descent